Scyphiphora is a monotypic genus of flowering plants in the family Rubiaceae. It is the only genus in the tribe Scyphiphoreae. The genus contains only one species, viz. Scyphiphora hydrophylacea, which has a large distribution range from India, to tropical Asia and the western Pacific. Its local common names include nilad or sagasa in the Philippines, ngam in Thailand, côi in Vietnam, and chengam in Malaysia.

Description

Its leaves are opposite. The leaf blades are broad and drop-shaped. Its terminal buds and young leaves are coated with a varnish-like substance. The flowers are tubular and have four white lobes that are tinged pink. They are arranged in dense clusters. The fruits are elliptic and deeply ridged, becoming light brown and buoyant when ripe.

Uses
Its dark brown wood can be used to craft small objects. Leaf extracts are known to be helpful for stomach aches. The flowers can be used as a cleansing or whitening laundry agent.

Culture

One popular — but antiquated and less linguistically plausible — etymology for Manila, the capital city of the Philippines, asserts that the city's name derives from this shrub, locally known as nilad. However, from a linguistic perspective it would have been unlikely for native Tagalog speakers to completely drop the final consonant /d/ in nilad to achieve the present native form of the name ("Maynilà").

The indigo plant is called either nilà or nilad.in Tagalog.

Chemistry 
The plant contains friedelin, syringic acid, isoscopoletin, fraxetol, casuarinondiol and guaiacylglycerol-beta-ferulic acid ether.

References

External links 
Scyphiphora in the World Checklist of Rubiaceae

Mangroves
Monotypic Rubiaceae genera
Ixoroideae
Central Indo-Pacific flora